Hackney Wick is a station on the North London Line in the area of Hackney Wick, East London. It is in Travelcard Zone 2. The station and all trains serving it are operated by London Overground. Between Spring 2017 and May 2018 the station was rebuilt and modernised, including replacement of the footbridge by a subway. The new subway, in addition to linking the two platforms will, later in 2018, provide a cycle and pedestrian link between Hackney and Tower Hamlets.

History
The station opened on 12 May 1980 by British Rail as part of the Crosstown Linkline service. The area had been served by Victoria Park railway station, a short distance to the west, on the Broad Street–Poplar branch of the North London Railway from 1856 to 1943.

This was to enable the installation of a new signalling system and the extension of 30 platforms. Engineering work continued to June 2011, during which reduced services operated and Sunday services were suspended.

However, due to potential overcrowding, TfL announced that westbound trains would not stop at this station for the duration of the Games.

Hackney Wick is one of four stations located around the park, along with Stratford, Stratford International and Pudding Mill Lane.

At 00:54 on 21 March 2019, two men were fatally electrocuted after climbing a wagon of a freight train stopped adjacent to Hackney Wick station. A coroner's report found that the men used a hole in a chain link fence to access the railway, and that fences in the area of the incident had not been inspected since 2016. The report also identified a number of failures in Network Rail's inspection regime.

Services
Hackney Wick currently has the following London Overground (North London Line) services, which is operated by Class 378 Capitalstar trainsets in off-peak.

8tph to Stratford
4tph to Richmond
4tph to Clapham Junction

Buses

London Buses routes 276 and 488 serves the station with London Buses route 339 serving the station indirectly on White Post Lane.

References

External links

 Excel file displaying National Rail station usage information for 2005/06 

 North London Line by Dave Bosher
 Biography of serial killers John Duffy and David Mulcahy 

Railway stations in the London Borough of Hackney
Railway stations opened by British Rail
Railway stations in Great Britain opened in 1980
Railway stations served by London Overground
Hackney, London
Queen Elizabeth Olympic Park
Hackney Wick